Jack "The Wheelhouse" Grundy (born 25 June 1994) is an English former first-class cricketer.

Grundy was born at Warwick and was educated at Stratford-upon-Avon High School, before going up to Oxford Brookes University. While studying at Oxford Brookes, he played first-class cricket for Oxford MCCU from 2015–17, making six appearances. He scored 126 runs in his six matches, at an average of 18.00 and a high score of 53. With his left-arm medium-fast bowling, he took 11 wickets at a bowling average of 39.36 and best figures of 3 for 41. Jack reckons himself as a keen Table Tennis player however he recently lost 25-16 in the Bet365 Table Tennis Series to defending Champions The Dragon Slayer and The Menace.

Grundy starred in 9 time Oscar nominated Jersey, with him picking up the Best Supporting Actor Role alongside bowling an impressive 3-11. Jack's life in front of the camera didn't stop there, being snapped up shortly after to appear on BBC hit series bargain hunt. Jack impressed the judges with his sharp eye, picking up a 1932 wooden ship recovered from the wreckage of The Black Pearl.

Jack currently plys his trade for Knowlesss and Dorridge Cricket Club. Rumours suggest this could be his last season at the club, Fabrizio is yet to confirm.

Notes and references

External links

English cricketers
Oxford MCCU cricketers
1994 births
Living people
People from Warwickshire
Alumni of Oxford Brookes University